Chin Kaji Shrestha is a Nepalese parliamentary Chief Whip of the Nepali Congress as of March 18, 2014. He was nominated for the post by the Nepalese Prime Minister, Sushil Koirala. Prior to becoming the country's whip, he was its Chief Secretary for a while. In 2014 he proposed to investigate the apparent "vote rigging" allegations which was reported by such politicians as Bal Bahadur, Kamal Prasad Pangeni, Rekha Sharma, Ram Narayan Bidari, Laxman Lal Karna, and both Bhim Bahadur Rawal and Bhanubhakta Dhakal of the UML Party.

References

Nepali Congress politicians from Gandaki Province
20th-century births
Year of birth missing (living people)
Living people
Members of the 2nd Nepalese Constituent Assembly
Nepal MPs 1991–1994
Nepal MPs 1994–1999